Anthony David Benavidez (born December 17, 1996) is an American-Mexican  professional boxer. He is a two-time WBC super middleweight champion, having held the title from 2017 to 2018 and again from 2019 to 2020. Claiming his first belt at 21 years, eight months, three weeks and one day old, Benavidez holds the record as the youngest super middleweight title holder in history, he is ranked second by The Ring second by the Transnational Boxing Rankings Board, and fourth by BoxRec.

Early life and amateur career 
David was born to a Mexican father and an Ecuadorian and Dominican mother, his older brother, José Benavidez Jr. is also a professional boxer. Both brothers are trained by their father. When he was 15, Benavidez's weight ballooned to 250 pounds, as he struggled with dieting and discipline.

Benavidez, who started boxing at the age of three, had an amateur record of 15–0.

Professional career

Early years 
Benavidez made his pro debut at the age of 16, defeating Erasmo Moreno by knockout in one round in Puerto Peñasco. Benavidez won the NABF Junior light heavyweight title, his first belt, against Rollin Williams in April 2015. At the end of 2015, Benavidez had a record of 12 wins, with 11 stoppages and no losses. In October 2015, Benavidez signed a promotional deal with Sampson Lewkowicz's Sampson Boxing.

On January 7, 2016, it was announced that Benavidez would start the year against Kevin Cobbs (10–1, 4 KOs) on a Fox Sports 1 edition of PBC Toe-To-Toe Tuesdays on January 18 at Club Nokia in Los Angeles. Prior to the fight, Cobbs was on a 4-fight win streak. Benazvidez started the contest quickly and kept Cobbs at a distance. He rocked Cobbs in round 2 on two occasions. After a few clinches, Benazidez hit Cobbs with a flurry of punches, prompting the referee to stop the fight at 1:08 of round 2. Benavidez next fought on April 30 on the undercard of Victor Ortiz vs. Andre Berto II at the StubHub Center in Carson, California. His opponent was Phillip Jackson Benson. Jackson was stopped in round 2 after being hurt many times in the opening round. The fight was scheduled for 8 rounds.

Benavidez would next take part on the undercard of the welterweight world title bout Keith Thurman vs. Shawn Porter, which was rescheduled to take place on June 25 at the Barclays Center in Brooklyn, against Francy Ntetu (16–0, 3 KOs) in an 8-round bout. In an entertaining fight, where both boxers traded, Benavidez won the fight via round 7 TKO. Benavidez seemed to get the better of the trades with Ntetu resorting to clinching by the end of round 2. After 1 minute and 30 seconds of round 7, the crowd booed as referee Shada Murdaugh stopped the fight due to the amount of punishment Ntetu had taken. It was noted that Barry Jordan, a NYSAC doctor, had taken a look at Ntetu and likely would have played a role. Benavidez led 58–56, 58–56 and 59–55 on the judges scorecards at the time of stoppage. Jordon later explained that it was upon his recommendation that the bout be stopped as Ntetu had taken a lot of punishment, mostly to the eye. In July 2015, PBC announced Benavidez would next fight on ESPN against contender Denis Douglin (20-4, 13 KOs) in his first 10-round bout on August 5 at the 2300 Arena in Philadelphia, Pennsylvania. Benavidez was taken to the tenth round but avoided hearing the final bell after stopping Douglin 35 seconds into the round. Benavidez simply broke down Douglin over the course of the fight. The referee stopped the fight as Douglin had taken punishment against the ropes.

Benadivez's first bout of 2017 took place on January 28 on the Carl Frampton vs. Léo Santa Cruz II undercard at the MGM Grand Garden Arena in Paradise, Nevada against fellow prospect Sherali Mamajonov (14–1, 7 KOs). Benavidez started the fight cautiously before unloading heavy shots that dropped Mamajonov before the end of round 1. At the start of round 2, Benavidez continued to land flash combinations and eventually dropped Mamajanov again. He beat the count, but referee Russell Mora stopped the fight because he appeared to be badly hurt. Benavidez spoke about the win after the fight, "I am a little disappointed because I wanted to give the crowd a spectacular knockout. This is my first time fighting at MGM Grand and I will never forget it. The atmosphere here is amazing. This fight week has been the best experience of my life. I want to continue to fight as much as I can. I want to perfect my craft, train as hard as I can and be the best that I can be."

On March 24, 2017, it was announced that WBC agreed to sanction Benavidez against former world title challenger Rogelio Medina (37–7, 31 KOs) for the #2 mandatory spot on May 20 at the Laredo Energy Arena in Laredo, Texas. Benavidez knocked down Medina three times before the referee waved the fight off in round 8, giving Benavidez the win. Benavidez was considered one of the top prospects at super middleweight.

WBC super middleweight champion

Benavidez vs. Gavril 
Following his draw against James DeGale, Badou Jack vacated his WBC super middleweight title in order to fight at light heavyweight. The WBC ordered a match between Callum Smith and Anthony Dirrell, with the winner taking the vacant world title. With Smith taking part in WBSS, he was replaced through Benavidez. The bout was scheduled for September 2017. However, on August 5, the WBC announced Dirrell was out due to injury. Instead, Benavidez would face Romanian contender Ronald Gavril (18-1, 14 KOs) on September 8 for the world title at the Hard Rock Hotel & Casino in Nevada. Benavidez defeated Gavril after 12 rounds by split decision. Two judges scored the fight 117–111, 116–111 for Benavidez, whilst the third scored it 116–111 for Gavril. However, Gavril proved to be Benavidez's toughest test so far, with most rounds being closely contested. Benavidez seemed to struggle with conditioning and was knocked down in the final round. Speaking on his record-breaking win, Benavidez said, “It feels amazing to win this title. It’s everything I’ve dreamed about since I was a little kid. It’s everything I’ve dedicated myself to and I’ve worked hard for. It finally paid off.” According to CompuBox stats, Benavidez landed 222 of 863 punches thrown (26%) and Gavril landed 162 of his 817 thrown (20%).

Benavidez vs. Gavril II 
Immediately after the first bout, rematch talks began. Gavril thought he won the first bout and disputed the decision. Benavidez's promoter Sampson Promotions confirmed on October 2, 2017, that negotiations had begun with Mayweather Promotions for a rematch to take place in January 2018. Benavidez stated he wanted to take the rematch to remove all doubt and set the record straight. In December 2017, a deal was close to being finalized for the rematch to take place on the undercard of Danny García vs. Brandon Ríos on Showtime on February 17, 2018. The deal was done a few days later with the bout taking place at the Mandalay Bay Events Center in Paradise, Nevada. In front of 6,240 fans, Benavidez dominated every round, winning via unanimous decision with the scores 120–108, 120–108 and 119–109. ESPN.com scored it a shutout 120-108 for Benavidez. he used different angles a variety of head and body shots throughout the fight leaving no doubt. Before round 11, the ringside doctor took a look at Gavril but allowed him to continue. For every one shot Gavril landed, Benavidez replied with fast combinations. Benavidez reduced the number of shots he threw in the final round, which allowed Gavril to give him some, but little trouble. After the fight, Benavidez said, "I knew he was going to come in aggressive. He's a one trick type of pony. He don't know how to do anything but pressure. I used that to my advantage -- jab, box him all day and when I saw the opening I took it. I didn't knock him out but he's a tough son of a gun." Punch stats showed that Benavidez landed 315 of 942 punches thrown (37%) and Gavril landed 176 of his 757 thrown (23%). For the bout, Benavidez earned $400,000 to Gavril's $125,000 purse. The fight averaged 458,000 viewers and peaked at 489,000 viewers.

Benavidez vs. Dirrell 
According to sources in Mexico on May 17, 2018, a deal was close to being reached for Benavidez to defend his WBC title against Russian boxer Matt Korobov (28–1, 14 KOs) on the Mikey Garcia vs. Robert Easter Jr. lightweight unification undercard on July 28 at the Staples Center in Los Angeles, California. On May 23, Top Rank's Bob Arum revealed he signed Benavidez to his stable and given him a signing bonus of $250,000. Upon the signing, Sampson Lewkowicz filed a lawsuit. According to Lewkowicz, Benavidez signed an extension with his company in November 2017, which extended his contract until 2021. By June 13, the suit was settled and Benavidez returned the signing bonus to Top Rank. On June 21, it was reported a deal had been reached for Benavidez to defend his WBC title against mandatory challenger Anthony Dirrell (32–1–1, 24 KOs). The fight was ordered by the WBC on May 21 and scheduled purse bids were due on June 22. A deal was reached on June 21. The fight was reported to take place on the same card as Shawn Porter vs. Danny García on Showtime on September 8.

Positive drug test and suspension 
On September 18, 2018, it was reported that Benavidez had tested positive for cocaine from a urine sample collected on August 27 by the Voluntary Anti-Doping Agency (VADA). He was eventually stripped of his title and received a four months-long suspension through February 2019 by the WBC. On 19 December 2018, it was announced that he would be returning to the ring on March 16.

Benavidez vs. Angulo 
On August 15, 2020, Benavidez fought Roamer Alexis Angulo. Benavidez weighed in over the super middleweight limit during the weigh in, and was stripped of his title yet again. Benavidez dominated Angulo in a one-sided bout, which culminated in a tenth-round stoppage, after Benavidez unloaded a barrage of shots on Angulo.

Benavidez vs. Ellis 
On March 13, 2021, Benavidez fought Ronald Ellis. Ellis was ranked #8 by the WBC at super middleweight. Benavidez stopped Ellis in the eleventh round via technical knockout.

Benavidez vs. Davis 
On July 14, 2021, Showtime announced that Benavidez was scheduled for an August 28 bout against former titlist José Uzcátegui at the Phoenix Suns Arena. However, on October 28, Uzcátegui was pulled from the fight due to failing a drug test, and was replaced by Kyrone Davis.

Benavidez vs. Lemieux 
Benavidez faced former IBF middleweight champion David Lemieux on May 21, 2022 for the vacant WBC interim super middleweight title. Benavidez dominated the fight, dropping Lemieux hard in round 2 and scoring a stoppage in round 3 after a brutal assault.

Benavidez vs. Plant 
On January 25, 2023, it was announced that Benavidez would be making the first defense of his WBC interim super middleweight title against former IBF world champion, Caleb Plant. The fight will take place on Showtime PPV on March 25 at the MGM Grand Garden Arena in Las Vegas.

Professional boxing record

See also 
 List of world super-middleweight boxing champions
 List of Mexican boxing world champions

References

External links

David Benavidez - Profile, News Archive & Current Rankings at Box.Live

 

American boxers of Mexican descent
American people of Ecuadorian descent
Sportspeople of Ecuadorian descent
Sportspeople from Arizona
Boxers from Arizona
Super-middleweight boxers
1996 births
Living people
American male boxers